Afrophidia is a clade of alethinophidian snakes comprising the groups Henophidia and Caenophidia, essentially making up the snakes people commonly associate with. The name refers to the deep split between Afrophidia and their sister taxon, Amerophidia, which originated in South American origin, and the afrophidians was recently hypothesized to represent a vicariant event of the breakup of Gondwanan South America and Africa.

Unlike the scolecophidians and amerophidians, which have evolved to be small, the afrophidians have evolved many larger species. This is also the group in which venom has been developed in several lines of snakes.

Below is a phylogeny of Afrophidia recovered from numerous phylogenetic work on snakes:

 Venomous

References

Alethinophidia
Extant Santonian first appearances